A chicane is an artificial feature creating extra turns in a road.

Chicane may also refer to:
 a bridge hand that is void of trumps
 Chicane (musician), (born Nicholas Bracegirdle), British electronic music artist
 Magnetic chicane, used to compress an electron bunch in a free-electron laser 
 Mark Winter, a New Zealand cartoonist with the pen name Chicane
 Gender-neutral term of Chicano